Cornelius Connolly was an Irish politician. He was first elected to Dáil Éireann as a Cumann na nGaedheal Teachta Dála (TD) for the Cork West constituency at the 1923 general election. He did not contest the June 1927 general election. He stood as an independent candidate at the 1944 general election but was not elected.

References

Year of birth missing
Year of death missing
Cumann na nGaedheal TDs
Independent politicians in Ireland
Members of the 4th Dáil
Politicians from County Cork